In mathematics, a quasi-Lie algebra in abstract algebra is just like a Lie algebra, but with the usual axiom

replaced by

 (anti-symmetry).

In characteristic other than 2, these are equivalent (in the presence of bilinearity), so this distinction doesn't arise when considering real or complex Lie algebras. It can however become important, when considering Lie algebras over the integers.

In a quasi-Lie algebra,

Therefore, the bracket of any element with itself is 2-torsion, if it does not actually vanish.

See also
Whitehead product

References
 

Lie algebras